Hussain Ul Haque (born 2 November 1949) is an Indian writer, Urdu critic and theorist with a Sufi approach in his thought and writings. He has received the Sahitya Akademi Award in Urdu for his novel Amawas Mein Khwab.

Early life 
Haque was born on November 2, 1949, in Sasaram, Bihar, India

Qualifications

Ph.D in Urdu from Magadh University - Bodh Gaya in 1985.
M.A Persian in 1972
M.A Urdu in 1970

Career

He started his teaching career in 1976 in Magadh University-Bodh Gaya- Gaya, India. He retired as Head of the Department and Proctor.

He has the Research Guidance Experience of 16 Ph.D. degrees being already awarded and 4 research work in progress state in the various fields of Urdu literature and education.

Hussain Ul Haque has also held the following posts in the field of Academia.
 Prof. in Charge (Persian ) from Dec-1990 to Jan-1995 (Magadh University, Bodh Gaya)
 Superintendent of Examination
 Member of Selection Committee and Screening Board of Patna University, University of Calcutta, Aligarh Muslim University etc.

Personal life 
Haque is a resident of New Karimganj neighborhood of Gaya, Bihar, India.

Different aspects of literary and cultural involvement

Story writer
More than 200 stories published in standard literary magazines of Urdu world. Dozens of them are translated in Hindi, English and Punjabi.

Novelist

Three Novels are published (1. Bolo Mat Chup Raho 2. Furat and 3. Amawas Mein Khwab).

Research Scholar, Critic and Essayist
More than 30 research papers presented and published.

Stories selected in Anthologies

Books published
 Aakhri Geet (Poetry-1977)
 Pase Parda - E - Shab (Short Story-1981)
 Soorat-E-Haal (1982)
 Barish Mein Ghera Makhan (1986)
 Ghane Jungalon Mein (1989)
 Matla (1995)
 Sooi ki Nok Par Ruka Lamha (1997)
 Bolo Mat Chup Raho (Novel- 1990)
 Furat (1992)
 Asar-E-Hazrat Wasi (Biography-2001)
 Asar-E- Baghawat (2008)
 Newn Ki Eent (2009)
 Nasr Ki Ahmiyat (2009) 
 Urdu Fiction Hindustan Mein (2010)
 Tafheem-e-Tasawwuf (2012)
 Amawas Mein Khawab (2017)
 Hussain Ul Haque ke Muntakhab afsane (2019) - Edited by Prof. Sagheer Afraheen (AMU)

Editing and compiling

 Harf-E- Tamanna (Nazish Sahsarami) Gazals-1984
 Tasawwuf Wa Rahbaniat (Maulana Anwar Ul Haque) Mysticism-1999
 Asar-E- Hazrat Waheed (Hazrat Waez Ul Haque) Biography- 2003
 Gyasut- Talebeen (Maulana Gheysuddin) Mysticism-2005
 Fauz-O-Falah Ki Gumshuda Kadi (Maulana Anwar Ul Haque) Mysticism-2007

Booklets
 Classicy Ghazal Ka Imteyaz - Research Paper, 2000
 Esharia Sadat-E-Qutbi - Research Paper, 2003
 Ittehad-E-Asateza Ki Ahmiat - Essay, 1983
 Tasawwuf Pasand Mosannefeen - Introduction, 1987

Works about Hussain Ul Haque
 Shahab Azmi, Furat - Mutalea wa Muhaseba (Patna University, 1995)
 Abdurraheem, Hussain Ul Haque ke afsane ( SKM University, Jharkhand)(2014)
 Saleem Ahmad, Furat ek Tajziyah (Jammu, 2019)
 Sagheer Afraheen, Selected stories of Prof. Hussian Ul Haque - 2019 
 Salis, Hussian Ul Haque ka Khususi Mutalea (Quarterly Urdu Magazine, Munger, 2019)

References

External links
http://www.urdutahzeeb.net/urdu-language-and-literature/afsana/2009-04-17-09-55-55/8-3
http://www.urdutahzeeb.net/urdu-language-and-literature/afsana/2009-04-17-07-08-59/3-7
https://web.archive.org/web/20110606111951/http://www.hinduonnet.com/thehindu/lr/2003/03/02/stories/2003030200270500.htm
http://www.sarwarraz.com/adabipage_en.php?id=429&pageid=7&title=Waaqia%27aatee%20Shaa,i%27ree%20Kyaa%20Hai?
http://www.sarwarraz.com/adabipage_en.php?id=187&pageid=7&title=GAJAL:%20Urdu%20shaai%27ree%20meN%20ek%20nayee%20Sinf-e-suKhan
http://imashwini.blogspot.com/2008/05/mothers-day.html
http://findarticles.com/p/news-articles/times-of-india-the/mi_8012/is_20070403/library-culture-decaying-state-patna/ai_n39439977/
https://web.archive.org/web/20090804161912/http://www.patnauniversity.ac.in/urdu.htm
https://web.archive.org/web/20100226090001/http://www.lancashire.gov.uk/libraries/resources/booklists/urdu.asp
http://hussainulhaquewburduacademyaward.blogspot.com/
https://www.youtube.com/watch?v=S8Z-l1MUqKM
https://www.goodreads.com/author/show/19080036.Hussain_Ul_Haque

1949 births
Urdu-language short story writers
Urdu critics
Living people
Magadh University alumni
Recipients of the Sahitya Akademi Award in Urdu